The Usta is a river in Nizhny Novgorod and Kirov Oblasts, Russia. It is a left tributary of the Vetluga (Volga's tributary). Most of its water comes from melting snow. The Usta freezes over in November, and stays icebound until April. It is navigable in its lower reaches. The town of Uren is located by the Usta.

References

Rivers of Nizhny Novgorod Oblast
Rivers of Kirov Oblast